Stockholm North Station (Swedish: Stockholms norra station) or Stockholm N has been the name of two different railway stations in Stockholm, Sweden. Both have been used mostly for freight trains and not for passenger traffic.

The first North Station was opened on 20 September 1866, first used as a temporary main station for trains on the northern lines. It was situated at Norra Bantorget ("North Line Square"), a square which got its name from this. All passenger operations moved to the central station in 1871.

In 1925 the station was moved to Norrtull, where a new North Station was built at the railway line Värtabanan. This station was in use until the 1990s. Parts of the station are now being replaced with new buildings for apartments. The main freight train station in north Stockholm is now Tomteboda.

Railway stations in Stockholm
Rail transport in Stockholm
Railway stations opened in 1866
1866 establishments in Sweden
Disused railway stations in Sweden